Owl City is an American electronic music project created in 2007 in Owatonna, Minnesota. It is one of several projects by singer, songwriter and multi-instrumentalist Adam Young, who created the project while experimenting with music in his parents' basement. Owl City developed a following on the social networking site MySpace, like many musicians who achieved success in the late 2000s, before signing with Universal Republic Records, now Republic Records, in 2008.

After two independent releases, Owl City gained mainstream popularity with his 2009 major-label debut album, Ocean Eyes, which includes the Diamond certified single "Fireflies". The album was certified Platinum in the United States in April 2010, with "Fireflies" being certified Diamond in January 2023.

In June 2011, Owl City released its third studio album, All Things Bright and Beautiful, which was followed by The Midsummer Station in August 2012. Owl City has recorded songs for several animated films, including Legend of the Guardians: The Owls of Ga'Hoole, Wreck-It Ralph, The Croods and The Smurfs 2. Owl City also has released several charting singles, most notably "Good Time" and "Fireflies".

Adam Young 
Adam Randal Young (born July 5, 1986) is Owl City's founder and only constant member. He was born in Ottumwa, Iowa, and raised in Owatonna, Minnesota, where he graduated from Owatonna Senior High School and then found work at a Coca-Cola shipping warehouse. He began composing melodies in his head while working, which he would then record in his studio in his parents' basement.

Young is a devout Christian and reports that his faith is the only thing more important to him than music. He describes himself as introverted and believes he has symptoms of Asperger syndrome. However, he has not been officially diagnosed.

History

2007–2009: Early years, Of June and Maybe I'm Dreaming
Suffering from insomnia while working loading Coca-Cola trucks, Adam Young began to compose music, recording with a C-1 Behringer Microphone. Among the software that he began with was Reason from Propellerhead. He began uploading songs recorded in his parents' basement to Myspace. He started to receive favorable attention for his music and then helped cultivate this nascent fanbase by being an open and accessible web presence, responding to any messages he received and constantly posting blogs. He has variously attributed the name Owl City to either his sister having a pet owl which once got loose in her church, or the 1962 short film An Occurrence at Owl Creek Bridge. His manager Steve Bursky later highlighted the significance of Young's engaging online manner in building his following saying: "People feel like they know him, like they've got a direct connection to him because of how he approaches his connection with them online." Through a deal with the digital aggregator CD Baby, he then started making the songs available for sale through iTunes. In 2007, Owl City released an EP titled Of June, followed by the 2008 release of the album Maybe I'm Dreaming. Of June reached No. 15 on the Billboard Electronic Albums chart, and Maybe I'm Dreaming peaked on the same chart at No. 13.

The viral phenomenon that was building through Myspace caught the attention of Universal Republic presidents Avery and Monte Lipman who approached Young with a view to signing the artist. Republic recommended Young partner up with 27-year-old manager Steve Bursky of Foundations Artist Management and the two began working together in late 2008. When later asked by HitQuarters why the label chose him for a major label act given his relative inexperience, Bursky said:

"I think they saw Owl City as representing the future of our business. This idea of a kid in a tiny town in rural U.S. being able to make songs in his basement that sound like Top 40 radio could never have happened ten years ago. By hiring a young management company who understands the business circa 2011 over a seasoned industry vet, who might not understand the online spaces well, showed a lot of understanding of where this kid was going to end up having success."

Owl City's label deal with Universal Republic was finally confirmed in February 2009. According to Bursky there was initially some disagreement about the direction Owl City should follow, telling HitQuarters: "They were ready to send him into the studio with big producers and polish him up to try to become this thing that he wasn't. But we put our foot down and said, 'Look, the reason you signed this kid is because it's working. Whatever it is about him—his music, his interaction with his fans, his brilliance in the online space—these things are connecting with people, and as soon as you change that you lose what's special about this artist.' To their credit, they really listened and they got it."

2009–2010: Ocean Eyes
Ocean Eyes, Owl City's major label debut, was released on iTunes on July 14, 2009, with the physical release following on July 28, 2009. The album debuted at No. 27 on the Billboard 200. Owl City released three singles from this album: "Umbrella Beach", "Vanilla Twilight" and "Fireflies". "Fireflies" topped the US and Canadian charts. Ocean Eyes reached the top ten on the US album charts, topped the US electronic charts, and also reached Amazon MP3's top 10 most downloaded album list. By April 2010, it was certified Platinum in the United States. On January 24, 2010, Owl City reached the No. 1 spot in the UK Top 40 Singles chart with "Fireflies". The song "Tidal Wave" also received significant airplay on Christian music radio stations. On January 2, 2011, it was revealed "Fireflies" was the 20th most downloaded song of all time in the UK.

Young was joined by Breanne Düren on several tracks; the most notable example of which is "The Saltwater Room". Owl City's live band consists of Breanne Düren (background vocals/keyboards), Matthew Decker (drums), Laura Musten (violin), Hannah Schroeder (cello), and Daniel Jorgensen (vibes). Relient K vocalist Matt Thiessen has toured and collaborated with Owl City on several tracks, including "Fireflies", where Thiessen can be heard providing the backup vocals. Young also produced Relient K's song, "Terminals".

"Fireflies" was released as a free download on the game Tap Tap Revenge 3 by Tapulous. Prior to the July 14, 2009, Internet release of Ocean Eyes, and the "Fireflies" single, Steve Hoover was hired as a director for a music video for "Fireflies". The video was to have had an exclusive premiere on MySpace, but had been leaked onto YouTube and Dailymotion hours earlier. "Fireflies" became a big sleeper hit, topping the Billboard Hot 100 in the United States for the week ending November 7, 2009.

Owl City is featured on Soundtrack 90210 with the song, "Sunburn", which was released on October 13, 2009. Owl City has toured with The Scene Aesthetic, Lights, John Mayer, Maroon 5 and Brooke Waggoner. He was also guest featured in the soundtrack to Tim Burton's Alice in Wonderland with a song, "The Technicolor Phase", that had already been featured in his debut album.

In 2010, Young revealed a new musical project known as Sky Sailing, which moved away from his usual electronica genre of music and introduced acoustic guitar and piano accompaniments into his work. The unrefined tracks were recorded in the summer of 2006 before he began making music as Owl City. His first album under this new project is entitled An Airplane Carried Me to Bed, and was released July 13, 2010, via iTunes.

In May 2010, Young collaborated with high-profile British electronic composer, producer, musician, and songwriter Nick Bracegirdle. Under his Chicane alias, Bracegirdle released the single "Middledistancerunner" on August 1, 2010, featuring Adam Young on vocals. This is the first single from the fourth Chicane album Giants. He also worked with famed Dutch producer Armin van Buuren, appearing on a track called 'Youtopia' from the van Buuren album Mirage. In September, "To the Sky" was officially released via iTunes on the soundtrack for Legend of the Guardians: The Owls of Ga'hoole. On October 25, 2010, Young released a cover version of the praise and worship song "In Christ Alone" as a streaming MP3 on his website.

Taylor Swift's song "Enchanted", released on October 25, 2010, was rumored to be about the time she met Adam Young. Young recorded his cover of "Enchanted" as a response, altering the lyrics to address Swift directly. He posted the recording on his website Valentine's Day, February 14, 2011.

In November 2010, a new album called Flight was released on iTunes for one of his other musical projects, Windsor Airlift. A new Christmas single called "Peppermint Winter" was also released during that month.

2010–2011: All Things Bright and Beautiful
Production on Young's third studio album began around mid-2010, with Young being announced as the executive producer of the album. On October 18, Young wrote an entry on his blog regarding his third studio album, saying that the album was nearing completion.

In February 2011, the title of the album was announced to be All Things Bright and Beautiful and that the album would be released on May 17. However, on April 6, Young released a statement on his website, along with lengthy previews of four of his songs ("Dreams Don't Turn to Dust", "Alligator Sky Featuring Shawn Chrystopher", "Galaxies", and "Deer in the Headlights"), that the release date for All Things Bright and Beautiful would be pushed back to June 14.

"Alligator Sky" was released as the lead single from the album on iTunes. Later that month and in early April, tickets went on sale for the All Things Bright and Beautiful World Tour, and All Things Bright and Beautiful became available for preorder. The song, "Galaxies" would be released as the second single from the album.

The music video for "Alligator Sky" would be released on May 6. Young discussed the concept in a making-of video posted on Owl City's VEVO account, "The concept is basically about these two guys who are leaving Earth. Rather than it being this very dark post-apocalyptic vibe, it's very optimistic, and so it's like people are excited to leave earth."

"Deer in the Headlights", the third single from the album, was released on iTunes on May 23. In June of that year, All Things Bright and Beautiful was released on iTunes. Although only a few days prior on May 20, almost all of the album leaked onto the Internet. The music video for "Deer in the Headlights" was released. It features Young driving through the night in a replica of the DMC DeLorean featured from the Back to the Future trilogy. Canadian musician Lights also makes a cameo appearance during the video.

"Lonely Lullaby" was released as a single on iTunes, which was previously available only to Owl City Galaxy members, on July 19. Young was interviewed in the August issue of Cliché Magazine. He also appeared on the cover of the magazine and the issue also featured some of Young's very own artwork. Later during the month of July at the Club Nokia concert in Los Angeles, Young announced that the concert was being filmed for a Live DVD. The recording was eventually released on iTunes in November 2011.

On November 15, 2011, Jumeirah released a commercial for their famous Burj Al Arab luxury hotel.  Young was called upon to compose the music for the commercial.

2011–2013: The Midsummer Station
In Young's final tour dates of 2011, he performed a new song entitled "I Hope You Think of Me". On January 2, 2012, Young wrote an entry on his blog regarding his fourth full-length album. Young said that he would be collaborating with more producers and songwriters, saying that his new record "Marks a flying leap in this direction". Young expected the album to be released around late Summer to Fall 2012.
In an interview with Billboard, Young revealed that the new album is around 80–85% complete, and that Dr. Luke, JR Rotem, Norwegian production team Stargate, Brian Kennedy and Emily Wright are involved with the production of the album. He was also unsure whether "I Hope You Think of Me" would make the final track listing.

Young, along with Jewel and Jay Sean, released a song in promotion of the Child Hunger Ends Here campaign by ConAgra Foods entitled "Here's Hope". On April 17, 2012, "Dementia", a song by Young which was intended to be included on his upcoming album leaked onto the internet. The song features additional vocals by Mark Hoppus of Blink-182.

Young announced that a new EP, Shooting Star, was to be released on May 15 and would feature four songs off his upcoming album, so that fans a could get clear taste of what the album would sound like. On May 24, 2012, Young announced on Twitter that Owl City's fourth studio album would be titled The Midsummer Station, and that it would be released on August 14, 2012, worldwide, apart from in the United Kingdom where it would be released on September 17, 2012. On June 21, 2012, Young announced that the release date of the album would be pushed back to August 21, 2012, but the UK release date would remain the same. On July 12, 2012, Young announced via Twitter that the UK release date would be pushed forward to August 20, 2012.

Young announced via Twitter that he would be collaborating with Carly Rae Jepsen on a new song, claiming that it would be released on June 26, 2012. On June 20, 2012, he released the single, "Good Time", via his SoundCloud account. The song was released on iTunes on June 26, 2012. It received generally positive reviews from critics, including Billboard: "It only makes sense that he's joined by Jepsen...[on] a track that could become a radio staple for the rest of the summer," and Entertainment Weekly: "'Good Time' goes down easier than a frozen margarita at a beachfront tiki bar." "Good Time" was written by Matt Thiessen, Brian Lee and Young himself. The song debuted at No. 18 on the Billboard Hot 100 and later peaked at No. 8, becoming his second top 10 in United States.

On August 8, Young announced through his email newsletter that he would be holding a "Release Day Listening Party" on August 21. and would be doing multiple TV performances, including The Today Show on August 22.

On August 18, Young released a small clip of a studio version of "I Hope You Think of Me". The following day, August 19, Young also released two demo songs: "Beautiful Mystery" and "Paper Tigers".

On October 5, the single "When Can I See You Again?", from the Disney film Wreck-It Ralph, was released.

On November 6, the EP Good Time (Remixes) was released, featuring many remixes, including one from Young himself.

In mid-2012, Universal announced that subsidiary Universal Republic Records would be closed down, with the label's entire roster being transferred to Republic Records; as a result, all future Owl City material will be released on Republic Records.

In December 2012, Adam Young released a cover of the Art Garfunkel song "Bright Eyes" from the film Watership Down and released it to his SoundCloud page; he had previously cited Watership Down as one of his favorite books, stating, "Probably the book that is super inspiring is a book called Watership Down by Richard Adams. It's from the late 70s, about talking rabbits, and it's a very grounded-in-reality book. It's not a kids' book, but it has to do with these talking rabbits and their adventure, and there's a lot of metaphors and crazy stuff. And that's always been a very inspiring thing. If ever I'm feeling dry, or going through writer's block or something, I just even leaf through some pages of that book and I'm like 'Whoa, I have to go make music!'" 

Owl City did not release a full studio album in 2013, despite such reports. In January 2013, Young stated that his new music would contain more EDM songs than his previous studio efforts. He hoped to record a song for the album with Ellie Goulding and claimed that his new album would be "edgy". Instead of a full-length album, Owl City released The Midsummer Station—Acoustic EP on July 30. The EP contained acoustic versions of the songs "Good Time", "Shooting Star", and "Gold", taken from his latest studio album. The EP also contained two previously unreleased B-side tracks: "Hey Anna" and "I Hope You Think of Me".

In the meantime, Young worked on multiple songs for animated films and television commercials. On March 4, the single "Shine Your Way", featuring Young and Yuna, was released on iTunes from the soundtrack to The Croods. Owl City performed a 90-second jingle for Oreo's "Wonderfilled" commercial in May 2013. In June, it was revealed that Owl City would appear on The Smurfs 2: Music from and Inspired By Soundtrack. The track, called "Live It Up", was released in the soundtrack album. Owl City released the single "Light of Christmas", which featured tobyMac, on October 22.  The song was created for the 2013 VeggieTales Christmas movie Merry Larry and the True Light of Christmas.

2014–2015: Ultraviolet and Mobile Orchestra 

2014 saw the release of the single "Beautiful Times", which features violinist Lindsey Stirling and was released on April 8. Young stated that he intended to release a steady "series of EPs" in 2014 rather than one larger recording, though he later considered and then confirmed that he would be releasing a full studio album in 2014. In June, Young announced that the first extended play would be titled Ultraviolet, and it was released on June 27. The day before, the "Beautiful Times" music video also made its debut on Rolling Stones website.

Owl City appeared on The Art of McCartney tribute album to Paul McCartney, covering the track "Listen to What the Man Said".

On October 7, Owl City uploaded the official audio stream for "Tokyo" featuring singer Sekai no Owari to his official OwlCityVEVO YouTube channel. An official lyric video for another new track, "You're Not Alone" featuring Britt Nicole, was published on the following day.

In December 2014, Owl City released a new single for Christmas: "Kiss Me Babe, It's Christmas Time".

Owl City released a promotional song, "2015", of him singing that he would be releasing a new album. On May 5, a sneak peek of Owl City's then-upcoming song "Verge" featuring Aloe Blacc aired on ESPN's "Draft Academy". The song was released as a single on May 14. Owl City released a second single, "My Everything", on June 5, 2015, followed by "Unbelievable" on June 25. In April, Young stated that Owl City would be returning with a new album, later announcing the release of Mobile Orchestra for July 10 of that year following the release of "Verge".

An animated video for "Unbelievable" was also released on June 29, 2015, and features Hanson.

 2016–2021: Scores and Cinematic
On December 18, 2015, Young announced that he would focus on a new project titled "Adam Young Scores". During each month of 2016, he composed and recorded a score based on a subject of his choice, which is something he had wanted to accomplish for a long time. On February 1, 2016, the first score, which is based on the Apollo 11 mission, was released on Young's "Adam Young Scores" website. This was followed by 10 additional scores on the first day of each month of 2016. In reflection of this discussion, each song, 10 scores, were all based on historical events that impacted Adam Young in some type of matter over the time of his entire career as a musical artist and personal lifetime.

On November 24, 2016, Owl City released "Humbug", which was a new Christmas song that also came with a music video. On June 15, 2017, Owl City released "Not All Heroes Wear Capes", a song about Father's Day, which was originally intended as an individual song without an album. On October 30, 2017, Young announced through his social media accounts that he would be releasing an 18-track album, Cinematic, with a release date of June 1, 2018.

He revealed that during the eight months from October to June, three EPs, which he has called Reels, would be released, each with three songs from the upcoming album, including "Not All Heroes Wear Capes". He stated that the inspiration for this album is from "the amazing people he has met and the places that he has seen."  The album's second single, "All My Friends", was released on November 3. On December 1, 2017, Owl City released the first, Reel 1. On January 12, 2018, a single from the album, "Lucid Dream", was released. The second Reels EP was released on February 2, 2018. The third Reels EP was released on April 6, 2018. Cinematic was released in its entirety on June 1, 2018. The album has 15 main songs, plus alternate versions of "All My Friends", "Montana", and "Firebird".

Owl City stayed quiet for the next couple years, but released a remix of "Jesus Freak" by DC Talk on January 1, 2021.

 2022–present: Return of Owl City and Coco Moon
Owl City released a cover of "All Star" by Smash Mouth on May 13, 2022. In June 2022, Owl City posted on social media with a new logo with the caption, "I'm back". Since then, he has been leading his fans on adventure to find clues about his return with cryptic clues and a special website, with a countdown that ended on September 16, 2022.

On August 12, 2022, a track he was featured on by Armin van Buuren and Gareth Emery titled “Forever and Always” was released.

According to his YouTube channel biography, Owl City is releasing a new album in 2023 that is described as "...a wildly imaginative body of work revealing his deepened devotion to the strange magic of creativity." The first single from the untitled new album, "Kelly Time", was released on January 6, 2023. The second single was released on February 3, 2023, titled "Adam, Check Please".

On February 9, 2023, Owl City announced via social media that he will be releasing a new 11-track album titled Coco Moon. The album will be released on March 24, 2023.

Musical styles and influences
Owl City's music is described as indietronica and synth-pop and is often described as belonging to the electronic music genre. Young has stated that he is inspired by disco and European electronic music, as well as instrumental genres such as drone, ambient, and post-rock. He cites his biggest influences as Johnathon Ford of Unwed Sailor and Thomas Newman. As he is a vocal Christian, Young also incorporates his faith into some of his music. Young's faith is evident on the album, All Things Bright and Beautiful, especially in the song "Galaxies". Explaining why the faith-filled song was added to the mix he said, "I feel like, if I were ever to hide the fact that that's what's so important to me, it would be a crime that I should probably be put in jail for."

Owl City also has been compared to the Postal Service, often critically, for his combination of fuzzy synths, ironic lyrics, and use of female guest singers. Pitchfork goes to say that "the surprise No. 1 single in the country, Owl City's 'Fireflies', jacks the Postal Service in such a bald-faced, obvious manner that getting into specifics feels redundant at best and tacky at worst." In response to the suggestion that his work is derivative, Young suggested in a 2009 interview with The New York Times that Ocean Eyes is perhaps the "next chapter" after the Postal Service: "The Postal Service released a record in 2003, and that was it. There was really nothing to compare it to until someone else came along and wrote the next chapter. Maybe that's this record. Maybe that's this band."

Touring band

Owl City is one of Young's many solo projects, with all music written, composed, recorded, and produced by him. During live performances he is accompanied by a group of supporting musicians: Verification is in the closing credits to the film.
 Breanne Düren – keyboards, backing vocals
 Jasper Nephew – guitar
 Rob Morgan – bass guitar, music producer
 Gabriel Hagan – drums Former'''
 Casey Brown – drums
 Matt Decker – drums
 Steve Goold – drums
 Daniel Jorgensen – guitar, vibraphone, bass guitar
 Laura Musten – violin
 Hannah Schroeder – cello
 Austin Tofte – keys, vocals

Concert tours

Discography

 Maybe I'm Dreaming (2008)
 Ocean Eyes (2009)
 All Things Bright and Beautiful (2011)
 The Midsummer Station (2012)
 Mobile Orchestra (2015)
 Cinematic (2018)
 Coco Moon'' (2023)

Awards and nominations

Note: **Shared with Carly Rae Jepsen

References

External links

 

 
American electronic dance music groups
American pop music groups
American synth-pop groups
Electronic music groups from Minnesota
Musical groups established in 2007
Performers of Christian electronic dance music
Republic Records artists
2007 establishments in Minnesota
People on the autism spectrum